Nation is the eighth studio album by Brazilian metal band Sepultura, released in 2001 through Roadrunner Records. Nation features guest appearances from artists such as Hatebreed singer Jamey Jasta, Dead Kennedys singer Jello Biafra, Ill Niño singer Cristian Machado, Ratos de Porão frontman João Gordo, and Apocalyptica.

According to the official site, a video for "One Man Army" was scheduled to be filmed at the end of August 2001. However, due to a lack of support from Roadrunner Records, the video was never made. Sepultura blamed Roadrunner for not promoting the album and left for SPV in 2002.

Reception 

The album received better reviews than Against, but sold fewer copies. As of April 2002, Nation has sold over 55,700 copies in the U.S. and went gold in Brazil.

Q magazine (5/01, p. 118) – 3 stars out of 5 – "A clutch of crowd-pleasingly brutal anthems...with a return to the more exploratory approach of old....the faithful will not be disappointed."

Alternative Press (5/01, p. 63) – 4 out of 5 – "There are plenty of touchstones to [their] days of headbanger hegemony....[new singer] Derrick Green's heightened tunefulness along with the broadened emotional resonance...should relate to an enlarged fanbase."

NME (3/31/01, p. 31) – 6 out of 10 – "Fiercely political and uncomprimisongly direct....it's taut and tense and if you buy it quick you'll get to hear their logic-defying cover of Bauhaus' 'Bela Lugosi's Dead'."

Track listing

Credits

Sepultura 
Derrick Green – vocals, rhythm guitar
Andreas Kisser – lead guitar
Paulo Jr. – bass
Igor Cavalera – drums, percussion

Other personnel 

"Border Wars"
Eduardo Marsola – spoken word
Mother Teresa – quoted citation

"The Ways of Faith"
Inder J. Kohli – spoken word
Dalai Lama Mahatma Gandhi  – quoted citation

"Saga"
Marinho Nobre – intro sample

"Uma Cura"
Marinho – additional bass, also co-composition on (3, 6 & 10)
Krztoff (Chris Liggio) – programming
Steve Revitte – assisting mixing, also on "Saga" (at RPM Studios, New York City)

"Tribe to a Nation"
Helmut Karbacher – spoken word
Einstein – quoted citation
Marinho Nobre – Music By – Spoken Word Musical Bed

"Valtio"
Apocalyptica – strings
Eicca Toppinen – cello; co-composition
Max Lilja – cello
Paavo Lötjönen – cello
Perttu Kivilaakso – cello
Juha Heininen – recording, & mixing (at The Hit Factory and Millbrook Studio)

Guest vocals
Dr. Israel – on "Tribe to a Nation"
Jello Biafra – on "Politricks"
Jamey Jasta – on "Human Cause"
Cristian Machado – on "Annihilation"
João Gordo – on "Rise Above"

Production
Steve Evetts – engineering; also recording & mixing (7, 9, & 15)
What? (Theo Mares) – engineering assistance (at Rio de Janeiro)
Ted Jensen – mastering (at Sterling Sound, New York City)
John Goodmanson – mixing (at The Hit Factory, New York City)
Steve Thompson – mixing
Dan Milazzo – mixing assistance
Albert Levsink – technical assistance
Jason Spittle – technical assistance
Mauricio Cersosimo – technical assistance
Shepard Fairey – cover art
Léo Dias – band icons
Tattoo – logo
Rui Mendes – photography

Chart performance

References

External links 

Sepultura albums
2001 albums
Roadrunner Records albums
Albums produced by Steve Evetts
Nu metal albums by Brazilian artists